is a Japanese light novelist and screenwriter from Nagano Prefecture. He won the Silver Prize in the 4th Dengeki Novel Prize for Boku no Chi o Suwanaide. Two of his series (Dokkoida?! and Kage Kara Mamoru!) have been made into anime series. He is also a member of Red Entertainment as a scenarist.

Works

Boku no Chi o Suwanaide series
Boku no Chi o Suwanaide
Boku no Chi o Suwanaide 2: Piment Sensou
Boku no Chi o Suwanaide 3: Dokkindokki Dai Sakusen
Boku no Chi o Suwanaide 4: Shito Shito Pitchan
Boku no Chi o Suwanaide 5: Accident wa Maximum

Dokkoida?! series
Sumeba Miyako no Cosmos-sō
Sumeba Miyako no Cosmos-sō 2: Yūenchi de Dokkoi
Sumeba Miyako no Cosmos-sō 3: Haikaburihime ga Dokkoi
Sumeba Miyako no Cosmos-sō 4: Saigo no Dokkoi
Sumeba Miyako no Cosmos-sō SP: Natsuyasumi de Dokkoi
Sumeba Miyako no Cosmos-sō SSP: Ohisashiburi ni Dokkoi

Boku ni Otsukisama o Misenaide series
Boku ni Otsukisama o Misenaide 1: Tsukimi Udon no Bakkyarō
Boku ni Otsukisama o Misenaide 2: Senaka no Imomushi Dai Kōshin
Boku ni Otsukisama o Misenaide 3: Ah Seishun no Satsuei Nikki
Boku ni Otsukisama o Misenaide 4: Hokkyoku Iro no Tenkōsei
Boku ni Otsukisama o Misenaide 5: Omohide Boro Boro
Boku ni Otsukisama o Misenaide 6: Ahiru Sagashite Sanzen Ri
Boku ni Otsukisama o Misenaide 7: 29 Banme no Katchoman
Boku ni Otsukisama o Misenaide 8: Kaede to Ōkami no Ichinichi
Boku ni Otsukisama o Misenaide 9: Tōko to Ōkami no Yoru
Boku ni Otsukisama o Misenaide 10: Ōkami wa Tsukiyo ni Warau

Itsumo Dokodemo Nin² Ninja series
Itsumo Dokodemo Nin² Ninja 1: Deatta Ano Ko wa Kunoichi Shōjo
Itsumo Dokodemo Nin² Ninja 2: Ansatsu Date wa Suteki ni Dokkyun
Itsumo Dokodemo Nin² Ninja 3: Nihon no Natsu, Chizakura no Natsu
Itsumo Dokodemo Nin² Ninja 4: Gokuaku o Futatabi!
Itsumo Dokodemo Nin² Ninja 5: Pink na Kinoko no Dai Jiken
Itsumo Dokodemo Nin² Ninja 6: Kasuga Makoto Massatsu Shirei!

Kage Kara Mamoru! series
Kage Kara Mamoru!
Kage Kara Mamoru! 2: Tsubaki no Hatsu Deito e no Michi
Kage Kara Mamoru! 3: Shinobi no Sato kara Kita Shōjo
Kage Kara Mamoru! 4: Raishū! Kōga Saikyō no Shinobi
Kage Kara Mamoru! 5: Kokanei Ōgon Densetsu
Kage Kara Mamoru! 6: Yūna to Yūna Ōjo Sama
Kage Kara Mamoru! 7: Hotaru no Isōrō Nikki
Kage Kara Mamoru! 8: Wedding Jidaigeki Musume
Kage Kara Mamoru! 9: Iga Musume Tachi ga Kita!
Kage Kara Mamoru! 10: Princess Airīn
Kage Kara Mamoru! 11: Urashima Yūna
Kage Kara Mamoru! 12: Saigo ni Mamoru!
Motto! Kage Kara Mamoru!
Motto! Kage Kara Mamoru! 2: Love Story wa Totsuzen ni

Nazuna Hime-sama SOS series
, illustrated by You Shiina (2 volumes, September 2001 - April 2002, Dengeki Bunko)

Video games

References

1980 births
21st-century Japanese novelists
Living people
Light novelists
Red Entertainment